Belavia  Flight 1834 was a scheduled international passenger flight from Yerevan, Armenia, to Minsk, Belarus, operated by Belavia. On the morning of February 14, 2008, the Bombardier Canadair Regional Jet carrying 18 passengers and three crew crashed and burst into flames shortly after take off from Zvartnots International Airport near Yerevan, the capital of Armenia.

The jet hit its left wing on the runway during takeoff, crashed to the ground, flipped over, and came to rest inverted near the runway. All passengers and crew managed to escape the aircraft before it erupted into flames, partly due to the timely response of the fire and rescue crews. There were no fatalities, but seven people were taken to hospital for treatment.

Aircraft and crew 

The aircraft involved,  (MSN 7316), was a 50-seat Bombardier CRJ100ER. It was a fairly new member of the fleet since it was leased by the airline and delivered in February 2007. The aircraft was built in 1999.

The captain was 50-year-old Viktor Shishlo, who had logged 9,215 flight hours, including 461 hours on the CRJ100. The first officer was 44-year-old Alexander Mukhin, who had 9,454 flight hours with 405 of them on the CRJ100.

Crash 

The airplane had arrived at Yerevan two hours before scheduled departure and was preparing for departure as flight B2-1834 from Yerevan (Armenia) to Minsk (Belarus) with 18 passengers and three crew. Due to reported reducing visibility at the main alternate airport, the crew decided to add another  of fuel about 30 minutes later during flight preparations.

The first officer performed the preflight check of the aircraft about 15 minutes after landing (and before refueling) and found all aerodynamics surfaces clean and dry by visual inspection as well as by touching the surfaces with the palm of his hand. The report  mentioned that weather conditions that are susceptible to frost contamination require the pilot in command to perform the preflight walk-around.

After engine start the crew activated the anti-ice systems of the engines, but the wing anti-ice systems were not activated.

The airplane banked progressively left after liftoff until the left wing touched the ground with the airplane veering left of the runway, rolled right separating the right hand wing, crossed the runway rolling on its back and came to rest right of the runway. Leaking fuel triggered a ground fire, which was quickly brought under control by the airport fire fighters.

Gayane Davtyan, a spokeswoman for the General Department of Civil Aviation of Armenia said that the jet, operated by the Belarusian airline Belavia, hit its left wing on the runway during takeoff and erupted into flames.

Fire and rescue crews were reportedly on site within 50 seconds. The passengers also helped the crew members out of the cockpit.

Yerevan's Zvartnots airport was temporarily closed after the crash, which took place at 04:15 local time. As of 10:30 local time, the airport was still closed while arrivals were being diverted to Gyumri's Shirak Airport. The first plane expected to land at Zvartnots was from Tehran at 11:30 local time.

Seven passengers received serious injuries while the remaining 11 passengers and three crew were unhurt. There were no fatalities.

Investigation 

Initial speculation pointed to icing on the wings which caused the left wing to stall upon lift-off. Icing conditions were reported at the airport during the crash, and the CRJs are very prone to wing contamination and icing since they do not have any leading edge devices.

The Interstate Aviation Committee (MAK) performed a test employing a CRJ-900 registration  to assess the accumulation and freeze of atmospheric moisture with large temperature differences between the ambient air and the remaining fuel in the tanks after landing. It was found that ice accumulated on the underside of the wing immediately after landing and grew 25 minutes after landing upon refueling. The upper side of the wing showed dew accumulation after refueling.

Investigation teams from the General Department of Civil Aviation of Armenia, from Belarus, and from Bombardier participated in the investigation to determine the probable cause of the accident.

Final report 

The Russian Interstate Aviation Committee (MAK) released their final report in Russian which concluded that the most probable cause of the accident was:

 The asymmetric loss of aerodynamics properties of the wing during takeoff, which resulted in stalling the aircraft immediately after liftoff, the left wing contacting the runway and the subsequent destruction and fire.
 The reason for the loss of aerodynamics properties of the wing in the current weather conditions was frost contaminating the surfaces of the wings. The cause of the frost contamination was, most likely, the temperature difference of air and cold fuel in the tanks.
 Takeoff below the recommended safe speed for contaminated wings aggravated the situation.
 The current standard procedures to examine the aerodynamic surfaces before departure, along with the inefficiency, can not fully guarantee the preventions of similar accidents during takeoff in the future because of the high sensitivity of the wing, that does not permit even a slight contamination of the leading edge.
 Deicing of the wings as required by an Airworthiness Directive by Transport Canada (Canada's Civil Aviation Authority) in the actual weather conditions released after another similar accident most likely could have prevented the accident.

See also 

 Aviation safety
 List of accidents and incidents involving commercial aircraft

References

External links 
 "CRJ-100LR (CL-600-2B19) 14.02.2008." (Archive) Interstate Aviation Committee 
Final Report (Archive) 
 "Пресс-релиз Национальной авиакомпании «Белавиа»." Belavia. 14 February 2008. 
 Photos of the aircraft involved at Airliners.net
 Belavia Airlines Accident In Yerevan, 21 Injured
 Reports: No Fatalities in Armenian CRJ Takeoff Crash 2008-02-14
 Crash: Belavia CRJ100 at Yerevan on Feb 14th 2008, wing tip strike during takeoff
 
  
 

Airliner accidents and incidents caused by ice
Aviation accidents and incidents in 2008
Aviation accidents and incidents in Armenia
Accidents and incidents involving the Bombardier CRJ200
2008 in Belarus
2008 in Armenia
Aviation in Belarus
February 2008 events in Europe
2008 disasters in Armenia